Estrées-Saint-Denis is a commune in the Oise department in northern France. Estrées-Saint-Denis station has rail connections to Amiens and Compiègne.

It is one of many villages in the north of France bearing the name Estrées. The etymology of the name is from strata (cognate of English "street"), the word for the stone-layered Roman roads in the area (some of which turned into modern highways). Hence Estreti, "village on the road" which developed into "Estrées".

See also
 Communes of the Oise department

References

Communes of Oise